Nakankoyo (also, Naku) is a former Maidu village in Plumas County, California. It was located a Big Spring; but its precise location is unknown.

References

Former populated places in California
Former settlements in Plumas County, California
Maidu villages